Guardians of the Galaxy is a 2014 American superhero film based on the Marvel Comics superhero team of the same name. Produced by Marvel Studios and distributed by Walt Disney Studios Motion Pictures, it is the 10th film in the Marvel Cinematic Universe (MCU). Directed by James Gunn, who wrote the screenplay with Nicole Perlman, the film features an ensemble cast including Chris Pratt, Zoe Saldaña, Dave Bautista, Vin Diesel, and Bradley Cooper as the titular Guardians, along with Lee Pace, Michael Rooker, Karen Gillan, Djimon Hounsou, John C. Reilly, Glenn Close, and Benicio del Toro. In the film, Peter Quill and a group of extraterrestrial criminals go on the run after stealing a powerful artifact.

Guardians of the Galaxy premiered in Los Angeles on July 21, 2014, and was theatrically released in the United States on August 1, as part of Phase Two of the MCU. Made on a production budget of $232.3million, Guardians of the Galaxy earned $773.3million worldwide, finishing its theatrical run as the third-highest-grossing film of 2014. On the review aggregator website Rotten Tomatoes, the film holds an approval rating of  based on  reviews.

The film has received various awards and nominations. Guardians of the Galaxy received two nominations at the 87th Academy Awards, including Best Makeup and Hairstyling and Best Visual Effects. It won four of nine nominations at the 41st Saturn Awards.

Accolades

References

External links
 

Guardians of the Galaxy (film series)
Marvel Cinematic Universe lists of accolades by film
Marvel Cinematic Universe: Phase Two